History is the twelfth studio album by German singer Thomas Anders. It was released by White Shell Music on 27 May 2016 in German-speaking Europe. Produced by Christian Geller, the album consists mainly of new recordings of former Modern Talking songs. It debuted and peaked at number 42 on the German Albums Chart.

Track listing
All tracks produced by Christian Geller.

Charts

Release history

References

2016 albums
Thomas Anders albums